National symbols of Poland are the tangible and intangible symbols, emblems or images that are found in Poland to represent the country's unique customs, traditions, cultural life and its 1000-year history. These symbols serve as the nation's portrayal of patriotism and dedication to their national identity. The Polish people and the Polish diaspora around the world take great pride in their native country, and associate themselves with the colours white and red. The expression biało-czerwoni ("whitereds") is widely used by Poles when referring to their compatriots. A crowned white-tailed eagle on a red shield or background has been Poland's national symbol and coat of arms since the Middle Ages. Other unofficial symbols feature visual personifications, music of Chopin, polka and polonaise dances, animals such as the European bison or the white stork, apples, red poppy flowers and religious insignia of the Roman Catholic church. Several have been popularised in recent years, notably the winged hussars.

Official symbols
The official symbols of the Republic of Poland are described in two legal documents: the Constitution of the Republic of Poland of 1997 and the Coat of Arms, Colors and Anthem of the Republic of Poland, and State Seals Act of 1980 with subsequent amendments. The Jack of the President is defined in the Ordinance of the Minister of National Defense on the Use of Insignia of the Armed Forces of January 26, 1996 with subsequent amendments.

Flag

The Flag of Poland consists of two horizontal stripes of equal width, the upper one white and the lower one red. The two colors are defined in the Polish constitution as the national colors. They are of heraldic origin and derive from the tinctures (colors) of the coats of arms of the two constituent nations of the Polish–Lithuanian Commonwealth, i.e. the White Eagle of Poland and the Pursuer of the Grand Duchy of Lithuania, a white knight riding a white horse, both on a red shield.

Coat of arms

The White Eagle is the national coat of arms of Poland. It is a stylized white eagle with a golden beak and talons, and wearing a golden crown, in a red shield.

National anthem

Dąbrowski's Mazurka is the national anthem of Poland. The English translation of its Polish incipit is "Poland is not yet lost". The lyrics were written by Józef Wybicki in July, 1797, two years after the Third Partition of Poland. The music is an unattributed mazurka and considered a "folk tune" that was altered to suit the lyrics. It was originally meant to boost the morale of Polish soldiers serving under General Jan Henryk Dąbrowski's Polish Legions in the Italian campaigns of the French Revolutionary Wars. "Dabrowski's Mazurka", expressing the idea that the nation of Poland, despite lack of independence, had not disappeared as long as the Polish people were still alive and fighting in its name, soon became one of the most popular patriotic songs in Poland. When Poland re-emerged as an independent state in 1918, "Dabrowski's Mazurka" became its de facto anthem. It was officially adopted as the national anthem of the Second Polish Republic in 1926.

Presidential jack flag

The Jack of the President of the Republic of Poland – Commander-in-Chief of the Armed Forces of the Republic of Poland is a jack flag used in the Polish Armed Forces to mark the presence and pay respect to the President of the Republic of Poland who is also ex officio the commander-in-chief of the Armed Forces. The jack is raised on Polish Navy ships when the president is officially on board, as well as on land, if the president is present. The design of the jack is based directly on the pre-war Banner of the Republic of Poland which used to be part of presidential insignia. The ordinance defines the jack of the President as "a piece of red cloth with the image of the state eagle (i.e. the White Eagle from the national coat of arms) in the middle, bordered with a wężyk generalski", an ornate wavy line used in the Polish military as a symbol of general's rank.

Other symbols
There are a number of official symbols used to represent Poland.

National animal
The European bison and the white stork have a long history with Poland and are believed to be the two national animals of the country. However, Poland's enduring national symbol is the white-tailed eagle, shown in the coat of arms.

Mottos

Poland has no official motto of the State, namely the one which is recognized as such by the Polish national law. However, there are some common phrases which appear commonly on banners, flags and other symbols of the Polish state. One of the most common of such unofficial mottos is Za wolność Naszą i Waszą ("For our freedom and yours"). Another one is Bóg, Honor, Ojczyzna ("God, Honour, Fatherland"). During the times of the Polish–Lithuanian Commonwealth, the Latin expression Pro Fide, Lege et Rege ("For Faith, Law and King") was in use.

Ethnonyms

The ethnonyms for the Poles (people) and Poland (their country) include endonyms (the way Polish people refer to themselves and their country) and exonyms (the way other peoples refer to the Poles and their country). Endonyms and most exonyms for Poles and Poland derive from the name of a Lechitic tribe of Western Polans (Polanie), while in some languages the exonyms for Poland derive from the name of another tribe – the Lendians (Lędzianie).

The Polish words for a Pole are Polak (masculine) and Polka (feminine), Polki being the plural form for two or more women and Polacy being the plural form for the rest. The adjective "Polish" translates to Polish as polski (masculine), polska (feminine) and polskie (neuter). The common Polish name for Poland is Polska.

Rzeczpospolita

The full official name of Poland is Rzeczpospolita Polska which loosely translates as "Republic of Poland". The word rzeczpospolita ("pospolita" - common and "rzecz" - an item signifying wealth, hence Commonwealth) has been used in Poland since at least the 16th century, originally a generic term to denote any state with a republican or similar form of government. Today, however, the word is used almost solely in reference to the Polish state.

National personification

Polonia, the name for Poland in Latin and many Romance and other languages, is most often used in modern Polish as referring to the Polish diaspora. However it was also used as a national personification or the symbolic depiction of Poland as a woman called by the Latin name of that country was common in the 19th century. This is exemplified in Jan Matejko's painting Polonia, depicting the aftermath of the failed January 1863 Uprising, one of the most patriotic and symbolic paintings by Matejko. Other personifications of Poland were created by artists like Stanisław Wyspiański and Jacek Malczewski.

See also 
 Polonophilia
 Culture of Poland
 List of cultural icons of Poland

References

National symbols of Poland